Saburo Kawakatsu   (born June 18, 1974) is a Japanese mixed martial artist. He competed in the Lightweight and Welterweight divisions.

Mixed martial arts record

|-
| Loss
| align=center| 5-7-1
| Takahiro Kajita
| TKO (punches)
| Shooto: Gig Central 11
| 
| align=center| 1
| align=center| 4:43
| Nagoya, Aichi, Japan
| 
|-
| Loss
| align=center| 5-6-1
| Daisuke Sugie
| Decision (unanimous)
| Shooto: Gig Central 6
| 
| align=center| 3
| align=center| 5:00
| Nagoya, Aichi, Japan
| 
|-
| Loss
| align=center| 5-5-1
| Takashi Nakakura
| Decision (unanimous)
| Shooto: Gig West 4
| 
| align=center| 2
| align=center| 5:00
| Osaka, Japan
| 
|-
| Loss
| align=center| 5-4-1
| Robbie Lawler
| TKO (punches)
| Shogun 1: Shogun 1
| 
| align=center| 1
| align=center| 4:49
| Honolulu, Hawaii, United States
| 
|-
| Win
| align=center| 5-3-1
| Chad W. Saunders
| Decision (unanimous)
| Shooto: R.E.A.D. 12
| 
| align=center| 2
| align=center| 5:00
| Tokyo, Japan
| 
|-
| Win
| align=center| 4-3-1
| Seichi Ikemoto
| Decision (unanimous)
| Shooto: R.E.A.D. 8
| 
| align=center| 2
| align=center| 5:00
| Osaka, Japan
| 
|-
| Win
| align=center| 3-3-1
| Tomonori Ohara
| Submission (armbar)
| Shooto: R.E.A.D. 3
| 
| align=center| 1
| align=center| 2:26
| Kadoma, Osaka, Japan
| 
|-
| Loss
| align=center| 2-3-1
| Takuya Wada
| Decision (majority)
| Shooto: Renaxis 2
| 
| align=center| 2
| align=center| 5:00
| Tokyo, Japan
| 
|-
| Win
| align=center| 2-2-1
| Takayuki Okochi
| Decision (unanimous)
| Shooto: Shooter's Passion
| 
| align=center| 2
| align=center| 5:00
| Setagaya, Tokyo, Japan
| 
|-
| Draw
| align=center| 1-2-1
| Takaharu Murahama
| Draw
| Shooto: Las Grandes Viajes 6
| 
| align=center| 2
| align=center| 5:00
| Tokyo, Japan
| 
|-
| Loss
| align=center| 1-2
| Hiroyuki Kojima
| Decision (unanimous)
| Shooto: Las Grandes Viajes 5
| 
| align=center| 2
| align=center| 5:00
| Tokyo, Japan
| 
|-
| Win
| align=center| 1-1
| Isao Tanimura
| Decision (unanimous)
| Shooto: Gig '98 1st
| 
| align=center| 2
| align=center| 5:00
| Tokyo, Japan
| 
|-
| Loss
| align=center| 0-1
| Sanae Kikuta
| Submission (keylock)
| Lumax Cup: Tournament of J '96
| 
| align=center| 1
| align=center| 2:04
| Japan
|

See also
List of male mixed martial artists

References

1974 births
Japanese male mixed martial artists
Lightweight mixed martial artists
Welterweight mixed martial artists
Mixed martial artists utilizing Nippon Kempo
Mixed martial artists utilizing karate
Mixed martial artists utilizing judo
Mixed martial artists utilizing boxing
Japanese male karateka
Japanese male judoka
Living people